Raymond Ernest Ragelis (December 10, 1928 – September 19, 1983) was an American professional basketball player of Lithuanian descent. He played one season in the National Basketball Association (NBA) after an All-American college career at Northwestern University.

Early years
Ragelis was born on December 10, 1928, to a family of Lithuanian immigrants. He attended the Washington High School in East Chicago, Indiana, playing for Johnnie Baratto; he led the Senators to the State Finals in 1947. He was inducted into the Indiana Basketball Hall of Fame in 1991.

College and professional career
Ragelis played for the Northwestern Wildcats. He was the first player in university's history to score 1,000 career points, and led the team in scoring for two years. Ragelis led the Big Ten Conference in scoring during the 1950–51 season, averaging 19.1 points, which earned him All-American honours. He was the last player from university's basketball program to lead the conference in scoring until John Shurna in 2012.

A  and  forward from Northwestern University, Ragelis was selected in the second round of the 1951 NBA draft by the Rochester Royals. He played one season with Rochester, coming off the bench in 51 of the 66 games and averaging 1.3 points per game, 1.5 rebounds per game, and 0.6 assists per game. The Royals lost to the Minneapolis Lakers in the Division Finals of the 1952 NBA Playoffs.

Later years
After his NBA career, Ragelis joined the military for two years and later started coaching. He first coached at Lake Forest College, and later served as an assistant coach at Northwestern University. After three years as assistant coach at Northwestern University, he became the head coach at Washington High School. Ragelis died on September 19, 1983, in West Side Veterans Hospital in East Chicago, Indiana.

References

External links

1928 births
1983 deaths
All-American college men's basketball players
American men's basketball players
American people of Lithuanian descent
Basketball coaches from Indiana
Basketball players from Indiana
College men's basketball head coaches in the United States
Lake Forest Foresters men's basketball coaches
Northwestern Wildcats men's basketball players
Power forwards (basketball)
Rochester Royals draft picks
Rochester Royals players
Small forwards
Sportspeople from East Chicago, Indiana